This is a list of volumes and chapters for the manga series Vampire Knight by Matsuri Hino. The series premiered in the January 2005 issue of LaLa magazine and has officially ended. The individual chapters have been collected and published in tankōbon volumes by Hakusensha, with the series concluding with nineteen volumes released in Japan as of November 2013. Vampire Knight was adapted into a twenty-six episode anime series by Studio Deen. The first season aired in Japan on TV Tokyo between April 7, 2008 and June 30, 2008. The second season, titled Vampire Knight Guilty, aired between October 6, 2008 and December 29, 2008. Two drama CDs and two Japanese light novels have also been created based on the manga series.

The series is licensed for an English language release in North America by Viz Media. In addition to publishing the individual volumes, the series was serialized in Viz's Shojo Beat manga anthology from July 2006, until the magazine was discontinued in 2009. The series is licensed for English release in Singapore by Chuang Yi. and the Chuang Yi editions are being reprinted in Australia and New Zealand by Madman Entertainment.


Volume list

Vampire Knight: Memories

See also
 List of Vampire Knight characters
 List of Vampire Knight episodes

References

Vampire Knight

fr:Vampire Knight#Liste des chapitres